Speakman is a Norman surname. It may derive from the Norman given name "Espec".

Alfred Speakman (1880–1943), politician from Alberta, Canada
Bill Speakman, VC (1927–2018), English recipient of the Victoria Cross
Bill Speakman (footballer) (1904–1960), Australian rules footballer
Dom Speakman (born 1994), rugby league footballer
Fergie Speakman (1900–1990), Australian athletics coach
Fred J Speakman, English naturalist and author
Harold Speakman (1888–1928), American author and artist
Harry Speakman (1864–1915), English rugby union utility back
Howard C. Speakman (1892–1952), United States federal judge
James Speakman (born 1888), English footballer
James Stanley Speakman (1906–1962), accountant, World War II soldier in the Canadian Expeditionary Force
Jeff Speakman (born 1958), American actor and an accomplished martial artist in the art of kenpo
John Speakman, British biologist working at the University of Aberdeen
John Speakman (politician), British politician and trade unionist
John W. Speakman (1900–1942), American lawyer and politician
Kristjaan Speakman, Sporting Director at Sunderland Association Football Club
Mark Speakman SC, MP (born 1959), Australian politician
Nik & Eva Speakman (born 1961 and 1969 respectively), British life coaches 
Percy Speakman (1885–1933), Australian rules footballer
Robert Speakman (born 1980), English former footballer
Sam Speakman (born 1884), English footballer
Sammy Speakman (born 1934), English footballer

Also used as a given name:
Thomas Speakman Barnett (1909–2003), politician born in Red Deer, Alberta, Canada
Philip Speakman Webb (1831–1915), British architect and designer

References

Surnames of Norman origin